Temple Street may refer to:

Roads 
 Temple Street, Hong Kong
 Temple Street, Singapore
 Temple Street (Los Angeles), California, US

Other uses 
 Temple Street (gang), a street gang in Los Angeles, California, US
 Temple Street Children's University Hospital, Dublin, Ireland
 Temple Street Productions, Toronto, Canada

Odonyms referring to a building
Odonyms referring to religion